Marshall Foch Robnett (March 18, 1918 – November 28, 1967) was a professional football player in the National Football League. He played professionally from 1943 until 1945 for the Chicago Cardinals and was included on their merged team with the Pittsburgh Steelers, known as "Card-Pitt", in 1944.

Prior to his professional career, Robnett was a consensus All-American selection as a senior at Texas A&M University. In 1940 after helping the Aggies to two straight Southwest Conference titles and the 1939 national championship, Robnett finished ninth in the 1940 Heisman Trophy balloting while being one of the primary blockers for Heisman runner-up John Kimbrough. Robnett's performance at Texas A&M helped make him a sixth-round draft choice by the Cardinals in 1941.

Marshall was also the older brother of Ed Robnett, who also played at Texas A&M. He was also a pro football player, however Ed played in the All-America Football Conference for the San Francisco 49ers in 1947.

References
Texas A&M Official Athletic Site: 1st Team All-Americans

See also
1939 Texas A&M Aggies football team
1940 Texas A&M Aggies football team
Ed Robnett

External links

1918 births
1967 deaths
All-American college football players
American football guards
Players of American football from Texas
Texas A&M Aggies football players
Chicago Cardinals players
Card-Pitt players